Konstantinos Karakatsanis (born 1877, date of death unknown) was a Greek athlete. He was born in Athens.

He competed at the 1896 Summer Olympics in Athens. Karakatsanis competed in the 1,500 metres. He placed in the bottom half of the eight runners who took part in the single race of the event, though his exact placing is unclear.

References

External links

1877 births
Year of death missing
Greek male middle-distance runners
Olympic athletes of Greece
Athletes (track and field) at the 1896 Summer Olympics
19th-century sportsmen
Date of birth missing
Place of death missing
Athletes from Athens